Mount Sinai Hospital in Hartford, Connecticut was a hospital founded in 1923, to provide a facility for Jewish doctors who, due to their religion, were unable to obtain staff privileges in other hospitals in the area. In 1995 it merged with Saint Francis Hospital & Medical Center, which had been affiliated with Mount Sinai Hospital since 1990, the first recorded instance of collaboration between a Catholic hospital and a Jewish hospital in United States. The facilities that once housed the hospital are now designated as the Mount Sinai Campus of Saint Francis Care.

References

Hospital buildings completed in 1923
Hospitals in Connecticut
Buildings and structures in Hartford, Connecticut
Jews and Judaism in Connecticut
Hospitals established in 1923
1923 establishments in Connecticut